The 1980–81 Yugoslav First League season was the 35th season of the First Federal League, the top level association football competition of SFR Yugoslavia, since its establishment in 1946. A total of 18 teams competed in the league, with the previous season's champions Red Star successfully defending their title, finishing the season two points clear of runners-up Hajduk Split.

Teams
A total of eighteen teams contested the league, including sixteen sides from the 1979–80 season and two sides promoted from the 1979–80 Yugoslav Second League (YSL) as winners of the two second level divisions East and West. The league was contested in a double round robin format, with each club playing every other club twice, for a total of 34 rounds. Two points were awarded for wins and one point for draws.

Osijek and Čelik were relegated from the 1979–80 Yugoslav First League after finishing the season in bottom two places of the league table. The two clubs promoted were NK Zagreb and OFK Belgrade, returning to the top level after being relegated in the 1978–79 season.

League table

Results

Winning squad

Top scorers

See also
1980–81 Yugoslav Second League
1980–81 Yugoslav Cup

External links
Yugoslavia Domestic Football Full Tables

Yugoslav First League seasons
Yugo
1980–81 in Yugoslav football